Sangbad Pratidin (lit.: news every day) is a daily Indian Bengali newspaper simultaneously published from Kolkata, Barjora and Siliguri. It was founded by Swapan Sadhan Bose, the owner and also All India Trinamool Congress representative at the Rajya Sabha, on 9 August 1992. The Editor-in-Chief is Srinjoy Bose.

Content
Besides the supplements like Coffee House (Published every Monday, Wednesday, Thursday and Saturday), PopKorn (Published every Friday), Aami (Published every Saturday) it also has a literary magazine called Robbar which is circulated with Sangbad Pratidin on every Sunday. Amal Aloy, created by cartoonist Amal Chakrabarti, is a popular cartoon strip published in the newspaper over a decade.

References

External links
  
 Sangbad Pratidin e-paper (E-Paper – Digital Replica of the newspaper)   

Newspapers published in Kolkata
Bengali-language newspapers published in India
Publications established in 1992
1962 establishments in West Bengal